Amund Nøkleby Bentzen (17 May 1903 – 19 May 1969) is a Norwegian priest and politician for the Christian Democratic Party.

He was a priest by profession, and thus stationed in different locations in Norway. During the occupation of Norway by Nazi Germany he led Milorg in Holtålen.

He served as a deputy representative to the Parliament of Norway from Sør-Trøndelag during the term 1945–1949. He met during 24 days of parliamentary session.

References

1903 births
1969 deaths
People from Holtålen
Norwegian priest-politicians
Deputy members of the Storting
Christian Democratic Party (Norway) politicians
Sør-Trøndelag politicians
Norwegian resistance members